Jovan Jovanović  (born 2 October 1985) is a Serbian footballer who plays as a forward for Dubočica. He is nicknamed Zmaj after the Serbian poet Jovan Jovanović Zmaj.

Honours
Radnik Surdulica
Serbian First League: 2014–15

References

External links
 
 Jovan Jovanović stats at utakmica.rs

Living people
1985 births
Sportspeople from Leskovac
Association football forwards
Serbian footballers
FK Dubočica players
FK Budućnost Banatski Dvor players
FK Spartak Subotica players
FK Radnički Niš players
FK Banat Zrenjanin players
FK Timok players
FK Sinđelić Niš players
FK Sloga Kraljevo players
FK Radnik Surdulica players
FK Novi Pazar players
FK Kolubara players
Serbian First League players
Serbian SuperLiga players